Oslo Waldorf School (Norwegian: Rudolf Steinerskolen i Oslo) is a Waldorf school located in the Vestre Holmen area in the Vestre Aker district of West End Oslo, Norway. It is an integrated primary, middle and high school with around 550 pupils. Founded in 1926, it is one of the oldest Waldorf schools worldwide. It is generally regarded as one of the most prestigious schools in Norway and many of its alumni have been noted in the arts, politics and other areas of society. The school is an independent non-profit foundation governed by a board consisting of representatives of the teachers and parents, and it is a member of the Norwegian Association of Waldorf Schools.

History

In November 1921, two years after the first Waldorf School was founded in Stuttgart, Austrian philosopher Rudolf Steiner held two lectures on education at the Norwegian Nobel Institute in Oslo (then named Christiania), and the plan to establish a Waldorf school in Oslo was conceived. Among those involved was Bokken Lasson, who also became one of the first teachers when the school was established in 1926. The school was originally located in Oscars gate in the Frogner district. As of 1932, the school had 102 pupils. Due to financial difficulties, the school had to close in 1936. Vult Simon and Gulle Brun however continued to operate a small Waldorf school in their home at Makrellbekken. In the autumn of 1945 the school was reestablished, and was located in a barracks in Frogner Park. In 1949, the school moved to Smestad, and in 1962, it moved to Hovseter, where it is still located. Its building complex has been successively extended over the years in different architectural styles.

Prior to 1961, the school received no public funding, and was funded entirely by tuition and gifts as well as by idealistic teachers who worked for relatively little pay. The school became entitled to regular public funding under the Private School Act of 1970. Originally a primary school and later also a middle school, the first high school class was established in 1978.

The famous Norwegian novelist Jens Bjørneboe worked as a teacher at the school in the 1950s and a private school obviously modelled after Oslo Waldorf School has a significant role in his Jonas novel, which is noted for its criticism of the public school system. He later published the book Under en mykere himmel; brev og bud fra en Steinerskole ("Under a softer sky; letters and messages from a Waldorf school") based on his work as a Waldorf teacher. In Norway, anthroposophy in general and the Waldorf schools in particular have been strongly associated with the cultural and intellectual elite of the country since the early 20th century, and among the school's alumni and parents are many noted individuals, particularly within the arts and the cultural sphere, but also within politics and business. Among the school's alumni is former Labour leader, Prime Minister and now NATO Secretary-General Jens Stoltenberg, and all three children of Labour leader and Prime Minister Jonas Gahr Støre attended the school.
The school and the Waldorf movement in general was a stronghold of the Riksmål language of the traditional elite during the Norwegian language struggle, and the school is still using the now classic alphabet book André Bjerkes ABC, published by Riksmålsforbundet in 1959.

The arts play a major role in the school curriculum and the broader activities surrounding the school, and the school includes a professionally equipped theater hall.

Due to its long waiting lists, pupils are often enrolled shortly after birth.

Alumni

Jon Almaas, TV personality
Lene Berg, film director
Vilde Bjerke, actress and author
Ketil Bjørnstad, composer and author
Nicolai Cleve Broch, actor
Eindride Eidsvold, actor
Gard Eidsvold, actor
Andreas Galtung, lawyer, musician and illustrator
Erik Fosnes Hansen, author
Kjersti Holmen, actress
Angelina Jordan, singer
Henning Kraggerud, violinist
Lars Lillo-Stenberg, singer-songwriter
Anneke von der Lippe, actress
Odd Nerdrum, painter
Petter Olsen, shipping magnate
Marcus Paus, composer
Kristian Siem, industrialist
Njål Sparbo, opera singer
Camilla Stoltenberg, Director-General of the Norwegian Institute of Public Health
Jens Stoltenberg, Secretary General of NATO and former Prime Minister of Norway
Peter Normann Waage, author
Johannes Weisser, opera singer
Nico Widerberg, sculptor and painter
Axel Zimmermann, singer and tennis player

References

External links
Oslo Waldorf School

Primary schools in Norway
Secondary schools in Norway
Schools in Oslo
1926 establishments in Norway
Educational institutions established in 1926
Waldorf schools in Norway